Dov Ber or Dov-Ber may refer to:

Dov Ber of Mezeritch, a disciple of Hasidic founder Rabbi Yisrael Baal Shem Tov
Dovber Schneuri, also known as the Mitteler Rebbe ("Middle Rebbe" in Yiddish) 
Dov Ber Abramowitz, an American Orthodox rabbi and author
Dov-Ber Rasofsky (Barney Ross), American world champion Hall of Fame lightweight and junior welterweight boxer